Azaria, or Azarya is a moshav in central Israel. Located in the Shephelah around five kilometres south-east of Ramle, it falls under the jurisdiction of Gezer Regional Council.

Etymology
Its name is symbolic, though there is a theory that it was named after Azariah of Judah. The symbolic meaning is an acronym from the Hebrew religious sentence 'עולי זאכו ראו ישועת ה (Oleh zakho ra'u yeshuat HaShem, lit. "Immigrants of Zakho (village in Kurdistan) saw the salvation of the Lord").

History
The moshav was established on the land of the  depopulated Palestinian village of Al-Barriyya on 30 October 1949 by 25 families from Jerusalem as part of the "From the city to the village" plan.

References

External links
Official website 

Moshavim
Populated places established in 1949
Populated places in Central District (Israel)